John Duarte may refer to:

John Duarte (politician), U.S. representative from California
John W. Duarte (1919–2004), British composer, guitarist, and writer